Juan Manuel Rodriguez Carillo (February 11, 1962 – March 20, 2008) was a Mexican luchador, best known by his ring name Bestia Salvaje, who competed in Mexican and international promotions during the 1980s and 1990s, most notably with Emilio Charles Jr. and Scorpio Jr. as part of the stable Los Talibanes. A second-generation wrestler, he was the son of Espectro II, the brother of Corazón Salvaje and the brother-in-law of Charrito de Oro.

During his career he wrestled mainly for Empresa Mexicana de Lucha Libre (EMLL), later known as Consejo Mundial de Lucha Libre (CMLL). He had several feuds during his career including ones against Ringo Mendoza, Mano Negra, and Héctor Garza. He won the CMLL World Tag Team Championship twice with Scorpio Jr., and the CMLL World Trios Championship with Emilio Charles Jr. and Sangre Chicana. He wrestled the last match of his career two months before his death in January 2008 in Guadalajara, Mexico.

Personal life
Juan Manuel Rodriguez Carillo was born on February 11, 1962, in Guadalajara, Jalisco, Mexico. He is the son of Espectro II. His older brother wrestled under the ring name Príncipe Joel, while his younger brother has wrestled under the names "Corazón Salvaje" and "Azrael". Rodriguez was married to a professional wrestler called Maria del Angel.

Professional wrestling career
Rodriguez made his professional debut on June 12, 1983, wrestling under the name Freddy Rodriguez, in his hometown of Guadalajara, Jalisco, Mexico. He continued in that role until 1986 when he became known as Bestia Salvaje.

Consejo Mundial de Lucha Libre (1987–2004)
On September 3, 1988, Bestia Salvaje defeated Águila Solitaria to win the Mexican National Welterweight Championship, the first title of his career. In October 1988, Bestia Salvaje lost his first Lucha de Apuestas ("bet match"), hair vs. hair match, to El Dandy which led to Bestia Salvaje being shaved bald afterward per lucha libre traditions. He successfully defended the welterweight championship against El Hijo del Santo on the EMLL 55th Anniversary Show as part of his 176-day reign. His reign ended in February 1989 as Ángel Azteca defeated him to take the championship. The following year, Bestia Salvaje began teaming on a regular basis with Pierroth Jr., winning the Mexican National Tag Team Championship from Ángel Azteca and Atlantis. During the 287-day reign ended as long-time rival Ángel Azteca joined up with Volador to defeat Bestia and Pierroth Jr. on March 9, 1991. After the team broke up, Bestia Salvaje once again focused on his singles career, winning the CMLL World Middleweight Championship on September 4, 1992, when he defeated El Dandy. During his reign as middleweight champion, Bestia Salvaje successfully defended the title against American Love Machine twice, Máscara Mágica, and Kato Kung Lee. His reign ended on December 16, 1992, as El Dandy regain the championship. A storyline feud with Mano Negra led to Bestia Salvaje losing a Lucha de Apuestas as part of the 1993 Juicio Final show, forcing Bestia Salvaje to have all his hair shaved off as a result.

Los Chacales (1995–1996)
In early 1995, Bestia Salvaje formed a trio with Emilio Charles Jr. and Sangre Chicana, referred to as Los Chacales (Spanish for "The Jackals"). The trio was one of eight teams competing in the Salvador Lutteroth Trios Tournament in March 1994. Los Chacales defeated La Ola Blanca (Dr. Wagner Jr., Gran Markus Jr., and El Hijo del Gladiador) in the opening round, Dos Caras, El Dandy, and Héctor Garza in semifinals, and finally Los Brazos (Brazo de Oro, Brazo de Plata, and El Brazo) in the finals of the one-night tournament. The following week, Los Chacales defeated La Ola Blanca to win the CMLL World Trios Championship, becoming the sixth overall championship winning team. Bestia Salvaje and Sangre Chicana competed in the 1995 Copa de Oro tournament but lost to Máscara Mágica and Ringo Mendoza in the first round. Los Chacales' reign as CMLL World Trios Champions lasted 357 days, before they lost it to Dos Caras, La Fiera, and Héctor Garza at the first Homenaje a Salvador Lutteroth show on March 22, 1996. For the June 1996 Torneo Gran Alternativa, Bestia Salvaje teamed up with Chicago Express defeating Dos Caras and Bronco, El Hijo del Santo and Olímpico, and Atlantis and Atlantico in the finals to win the tournament. The following month, he competed in the 3rd Annual Grand Prix Tournament defeating Yone Genjin in the opening rounds before being eliminated by The Great Sasuke in the semi-finals.

Bestia and Scorpio Jr. (1996–1999)
After the break-up of Los Chacales, Bestia Salvaje formed a regular team with Scorpio Jr. The team became involved in a controversial storyline as they teamed with El Felino against Felino's brother Negro Casas, El Dandy, and Héctor Garza. During the match it appeared like El Felino turned on his brother, allowing Bestia Salvaje and Scorpio Jr. to double team Negro Casas. During the final moments of the match, El Felino removed his mask, revealing that it was actually El Hijo del Santo in disguise, making his surprise CMLL return after losing to Casas at the CMLL 63rd Anniversary Show. The surprise appearance of El Hijo del Santo and the attack on Negro Casas resulted in a minor riot in Arena Mexico. This led to Bestia and Scorpio Jr. teaming with El Hijo del Santo on a regular basis over the following two years, often opposite Negro Casas and various partners. In late 1998 Bestia Salvaje and Scorpio Jr. turned on El Hijo del Santo during a match, leading to Negro Casas saving his former rival. Bestia and Scorpio Jr. won the vacant CMLL World Tag Team Championship after defeating the Headhunters, Atlantis and Lizmark, and El Satánico and Dr. Wagner Jr. on November 13, 1998, in a tournament for the title. The tag team championship became a focus of the storyline with El Hijo del Santo and Negro Casas, which led to a match on February 5, 1999. Casas and Hijo del Santo won by disqualification and thus the championship as well, but refused to accept the belts due to how the match ended. The two teams had a rematch the following week, where Bestia Salvaje and Scorpio Jr. regained the championship. The storyline reached its highlight at the 1999 Homenaje a Dos Leyendas show on March 19. The show was El Hijo del Santo risk his mask and Negro Casas risk his hair as they defeated Bestia Salvaje and Scorpio Jr. in the main event. As a result of the loss, Bestia Salvaje was shaved bald, while the masked Scorpio Jr. was forced to remove his mask and reveal his name.

Los Guapos (1999–2002)
After Shocker lost his mask at the CMLL 66th Anniversary Show he stated he was okay with being unmasked since his face was "1000% Guapo" ("1000% Handsom"). He  developed a narcissistic, self-obsessed rudo character, who exhibited various metrosexual traits and looked down on those who were less handsome than him. Shockerbegan to team up with Bestia Salvaje and Scorpio Jr. on a regular basis. Following a series of vignettes, Shocker convinced both of his partners to have their hair bleached blond and that they were also Guapo like him forming a group known as Los Guapos. Scorpiro, Jr. and Bestia Negra were both older, seasoned veteran wrestlers and neither were actually considered good looking, in fact, Scorpio, Jr.'s nickname up until that point had been El Rey Feo ("The Ugly King"). In 2000, Shocker was invited to work for New Japan Pro-Wrestling (NJPW) on several occasions and due to his NJPW tours of Japan Scorpio Jr. and Bestia Negra often found themselves without a partner for Trios matches. Their solution was to bring in another veteran Emilio Charles Jr. to become the fourth Guapo team member, Charles Jr. like his partners used the Guapo name more ironically than factual. After returning from NJPW Shocker objected to someone joining "his" group without his approval, but at first went along with it. Over the following months, Shocker's displeasure with the rest of the team grew, and eventually, he split from the team, turning tecnico in the process. Shocker began a long-running storyline feud with Los Guapos. The storyline built to its peak at the 2001 Sin Piedad show on December 14. In the main event, Shocker defeated Emilio Charles Jr. in a Lucha de Apuestas match, forcing Charles to have all his hair shaved off because he lost. As a result of the victory, Shocker regained the rights to the "Los Guapos" name.

Los Talibanes (2002–2004)
While Shocker reformed Los Guapos, initially with Máscara Mágica and later El Terrible, Bestia Salvaje, Scorpio Jr., and Emilio Charles Jr. became known as Los Talibanes (The Taleban). As part of their image change, all three wrestlers began wearing Bedouin robes and headdresses to the ring, pretending to be part of the terrorist group. The feud with Shocker and his group continued for the following two years, including several multi-man Lucha de Apuestas matches. On August 1, 2003, El Terrible defeated Bestia Salvaje in a domo de la muerte steel cage match that also included the other members of Los Talibanes and Los Guapos. The feud culminated in another six-way Lucha de Apuestas match on September 24, 2004, ending with Shocker pinning Bestia Salvaje, forcing him to have his hair shaved off afterward.

International Wrestling Revolution Group (2000–2007)
While working for CMLL, Bestia Salvaje also worked on occasion for International Wrestling Revolution Group (IWRG) based in Naucalpan, State of Mexico, through a CMLL/IWRG arrangement. In one of his first appearances for IWRG, Los Guapos lost a match for the IWRG Intercontinental Trios Championship against Los Villanos (Villano III, Villano IV, and Villano V). The same trio, now billed as Los Talibanes, returned to IWRG on October 17, 2002, to once again unsuccessfully challenge Los Villanos for the IWRG Intercontinental Trios Championship. Once his stint with CMLL ended in 2004, Bestia Salvaje made regular appearances for IWRG. He was one of 10 wrestlers to risk their hair or mask in IWRG's 2005 El Castillo del Terror event, where he kept his hair safe while Masada defeated Cerebro Negro. A month later he defeated Cyborg in a Lucha de Apuestas match, leaving him bald as a result. His last major match was on March 18, 2007, where he was one of ten wrestlers to compete in an "Ultimate Jeopardy" steel cage match where both the IWRG Intercontinental Welterweight Championship and the Mexican National Light Heavyweight Championship was on the line. In the end Fantasma de la Opera pinned Cerebro Negro to win the welterweight championship, with Bestia Salvaje not involved in the finish of the match. Bestia Salvaje wrestled his last IWRG match on April 12, 2007, teaming with Cien Caras Jr. and Máscara Año 2000 Jr. to defeat Dr. Wagner Jr., El Hijo de Anibal, and Rayo de Jalisco Jr. The final match of Rodriguez's career took place on January 6, 2008, as he, Bucanero Jr., and Príncipe Azteca wrestled Black Steel, El Hijo del Solitario, and Gran Misterio on a show in Guadalajara, Jalisco, Mexico.

Death
Rodriguez died on March 20, 2008 of liver disease.

Championships and accomplishments
Consejo Mundial de Lucha Libre
CMLL World Middleweight Championship (1 time)
CMLL World Tag Team Championship (2 times) – with Scorpio Jr.
CMLL World Trios Championship (1 time) – with Emilio Charles Jr. and Sangre Chicana
Torneo Gran Alternativa (1996 (I)) – with Chicago Express
Copa Arena Coliseo (1994) – with Cachorro Mendoza
Mexican National Tag Team Championship (1 time) – with Pierroth Jr.
Mexican National Welterweight Championship (1 time)
Salvador Lutteroth Trios Tournament – with Emilio Charles Jr. and Sangre Chicana
Pro Wrestling Illustrated
PWI ranked him #326 of the 500 best singles wrestlers during the PWI Years in 2003

Luchas de Apuestas record

See also
 List of premature professional wrestling deaths

Footnotes

References

1962 births
2008 deaths
Mexican male professional wrestlers
Professional wrestlers from Jalisco
People from Guadalajara, Jalisco
Deaths from liver disease
20th-century professional wrestlers
21st-century professional wrestlers
Mexican National Tag Team Champions
CMLL World Middleweight Champions
CMLL World Tag Team Champions
CMLL World Trios Champions
Mexican National Welterweight Champions